The Sonoran hot dog is a style of hot dog that originated in Hermosillo, the capital of the Mexican state of Sonora, in the late 1980s. It is popular in Tucson, Phoenix, and elsewhere in southern Arizona.  It consists of a hot dog that is wrapped in bacon and grilled, served on a bolillo-style hot dog bun, and topped with pinto beans, onions, tomatoes, and a variety of additional condiments, often including mayonnaise, mustard, and jalapeño salsa.

The Sonoran hot dog is prepared and sold by vendors called "dogueros" at street carts. It was estimated in 2009 that over 200 places in Tucson purveyed the Sonoran hot dog, and that Phoenix had even more.

Notable purveyors 

 El Guero Canelo

See also
 Hot dog variations
 List of hot dogs

References

Cuisine of the Southwestern United States
Hot dogs